Bradybaenus festivus is a species of ground beetle in the family Carabidae. It is found in India and Sri Lanka.

References 

Beetles described in 1829